The Double Diamond International was a team golf tournament that was played from 1971 to 1977. It was hosted in England for the first three years, and then in Scotland.

From 1974 and 1977 the event was preceded by an individual 36-hole stroke play tournament that was included on the British PGA tournament circuit; the circuit would later become officially recognised as the European Tour.

Winners

England won in 1976 by being 2 holes up in the four matches played in the final against the Rest of the World.

1971
The tournament was played on 21, 22, and 23 October, between the four home nations at South Staffs Golf Club, with each team playing the other three. There were teams of 6, with 2 foursomes matches in the morning and 6 singles in the afternoon. All matches were over 18 holes. The total prize money was £10,250.

The teams were:
England: Bernard Hunt (captain), Peter Butler, Neil Coles, John Garner, Tommy Horton, Peter Townsend
Scotland: Eric Brown (captain), Andrew Brooks, Bernard Gallacher, David Ingram, Frank Rennie, Ronnie Shade
Wales: Dai Rees (captain), Kim Dabson, Craig Defoy, Brian Huggett, David Llewellyn, David Vaughan
Ireland: Christy O'Connor Sr (captain), Hugh Boyle, Vince Hood, Hugh Jackson, Jimmy Kinsella, Paddy Skerritt

Matches
Thursday 21 October

Friday 22 October

Saturday 23 October

Final table

Neil Coles, John Garner, Tommy Horton, Jimmy Kinsella, Peter Townsend won their 3 singles matches and shared the individual prize of £350. Kinsella beat all the three opposing captains in his singles matches.

1972
The tournament was played on 31 August and 1 and 2 September between six teams, the four home nations, Continental Europe and the Rest of the World. The event was played at Pannal Golf Club, Harrogate with each team playing the other five. There were teams of 8 with each match consisting of 6 singles matches over 18 holes. Two points were awarded for each match won with one point for a halved match. The overall winner was decided on points won. The total prize money was £15,000.

The teams were:
England: Bernard Hunt (Captain), Peter Butler, John Garner, Guy Hunt, Tony Jacklin, Doug McClelland, Lionel Platts, Peter Townsend
Scotland: Eric Brown (Captain), Harry Bannerman, Brian Barnes, Gordon Cunningham, Bernard Gallacher, Ronnie Shade, Bobby Walker, Norman Wood
Wales: Dai Rees (Captain), Kim Dabson, Craig Defoy, Brian Huggett, David Llewellyn, Andrew Phillips, Dave Thomas, David Vaughan
Ireland: Christy O'Connor Snr (Captain), Hugh Boyle, Vince Hood, Hugh Jackson, Jimmy Kinsella, Christy O'Connor Jnr, John O'Leary, Eddie Polland
Continental Europe: Ramón Sota (Captain), Manuel Ballesteros, Valentín Barrios, Roberto Bernardini, Ángel Gallardo, Jaime Gallardo, Donald Swaelens, Ettore Della Torre
Rest of the World: Peter Thomson (Captain), Hugh Baiocchi, Vin Baker, Gary Baleson, Dale Hayes, Jack Newton, Ian Stanley, Guy Wolstenholme

Matches
Thursday 31 August

Friday 1 September

Saturday 2 September

Final table

1973
The tournament was played on 30, 31 August and 1 September between six teams, the four home nations,  Continental Europe and the Rest of the World. The event was played at Prince's Golf Club, Sandwich with each team playing the other five. There were teams of 5 with each match consisting of 4 singles matches over 18 holes. Two points were awarded for each match won with one point for a halved match. The overall winner was decided on points won. The total prize money remained at £15,000.

The teams were:
England: Bernard Hunt (Captain), Maurice Bembridge, Neil Coles, Tony Jacklin, Peter Oosterhuis
Scotland: Eric Brown (Captain), Brian Barnes, Bernard Gallacher, Ronnie Shade, Sam Torrance
Wales: Dai Rees (Captain), Craig Defoy, Brian Huggett, Dave Thomas, David Vaughan
Ireland: Christy O'Connor Snr (Captain), Hugh Jackson, Jimmy Kinsella, John O'Leary, Eddie Polland
Continental Europe: Manuel Ballesteros, Jaime Benito, Jan Dorrestein, Jean Garaïalde, Donald Swaelens (Captain unknown)
Rest of the World: Bob Charles (Captain), Hugh Baiocchi, Bob Dickson, Orville Moody, Jack Newton

Matches
Thursday 30 August

Friday 31 August

Saturday 1 September

Final table

1974
The tournament was played on 22, 23 and 24 August between six teams, the four home nations, the Continental Europe and the Rest of the World. The event was played at Gleneagles with each team playing the other five. There were teams of 5 with each match consisting of 4 singles matches over 18 holes. Two points were awarded for each match won with one point for a halved match. The overall winner was decided on points won.

The teams were:
England: Peter Oosterhuis (Captain), Maurice Bembridge, Tommy Horton, Tony Jacklin, Peter Townsend
Scotland: Brian Barnes (Captain), Harry Bannerman, David Chillas, Bernard Gallacher, Ronnie Shade
Wales: Brian Huggett (Captain), Craig Defoy, David Llewellyn, Andrew Phillips, David Vaughan
Ireland: Christy O'Connor Snr (Captain), Jimmy Kinsella, Christy O'Connor Jnr, John O'Leary, Eddie Polland
Continental Europe: Donald Swaelens (Captain), Jan Dorrestein, José María Cañizares, Ángel Gallardo, Manuel Piñero
Rest of the World: Billy Casper (Captain), Bob Charles, Dale Hayes, Jack Newton, Doug Sanders

Matches
Thursday 22 August

Friday 23 August

Saturday 24 August

Final table

1975
The tournament was played on 25, 26 and 27 September between six teams, the four home nations, The Americas and the Rest of the World. The event was played at Turnberry with each team playing the other five. There were teams of 5 with each match consisting of 4 singles matches over 18 holes. Two points were awarded for each match won with one point for a halved match. The overall winner was decided on points won.

The teams were:
England: Neil Coles (Captain), Maurice Bembridge, Malcolm Gregson, Tommy Horton, Guy Hunt
Scotland: Brian Barnes (Captain), Bernard Gallacher, David Huish, Ronnie Shade, Norman Wood
Wales: Dai Rees (Captain), Craig Defoy, Brian Huggett, David Llewellyn, David Vaughan
Ireland: Christy O'Connor Snr (Captain), Eamonn Darcy, Christy O'Connor Jnr, John O'Leary, Eddie Polland
The Americas: Billy Casper (Captain), Jim Colbert, Lou Graham, Roberto De Vicenzo, Hale Irwin
Rest of the World: Gary Player (Captain), Seve Ballesteros, Bob Charles, Dale Hayes, Jack Newton

Matches
Thursday 25 September

Friday 26 September

Saturday 27 September

Final table

1976
The tournament was played on 19, 20 and 21 August between eight teams, the four home nations, Continental Europe, the United States, Australasia and the Rest of the World. The event was played at Gleneagles. Teams were divided into two group of four with the each team playing the others in the group on the first two days. The leading two teams in each group then played semi-finals and a final on the last day. There were teams of 5 with each match consisting of 4 singles matches over 18 holes. In the group matches, one point was awarded for each match won with half a point for a halved match. The order of the groups was decided on points won. In the event of a tie between two teams the order was decided by the result of the match between the teams and, if this was a tie, on net holes up overall.

The teams were:
England: Tony Jacklin (Captain), Peter Butler, Neil Coles, Martin Foster, Tommy Horton, Guy Hunt
Scotland: Brian Barnes (Captain), Bernard Gallacher, David Huish, Sam Torrance, Norman Wood
Wales: Dai Rees (Captain), Craig Defoy, Brian Huggett, David Llewellyn, David Vaughan
Ireland: Christy O'Connor Snr (Captain), Eamonn Darcy, Christy O'Connor Jnr, John O'Leary, Eddie Polland
Continental Europe: Manuel Piñero (Captain), Francisco Abreu, Salvador Balbuena, Seve Ballesteros, Antonio Garrido
United States: Johnny Miller (Captain), Lou Graham, Mark Hayes, Jerry Heard, Dave Hill
Australasia: Bob Charles (Captain), Jack Newton, Simon Owen, Ian Stanley, Guy Wolstenholme
Rest of the World: Gary Player (Captain), Hugh Baiocchi, Vicente Fernández, Simon Hobday, Kazuo Yoshikawa

Group matches
Thursday 19 August

Friday 20 August

Group tables

England finished ahead of Ireland since they were 3 holes up while Wales were level.

Scotland finished ahead of Wales since they were 9 holes up while Wales were 6 holes down.

Knock-out
Saturday 21 August

{{4TeamBracket|seeds=no|nowrap=y
| RD1-team1  = Rest of the World
| RD1-score1 = 3½
| RD1-team2  =  Scotland
| RD1-score2 = ½
| RD1-team3  =  England
| RD1-score3 = ''3½| RD1-team4  =  Europe
| RD1-score4 = ½
| RD2-team1  = Rest of the World
| RD2-score1 = 2
| RD2-team2  =  England| RD2-score2 = 2| RD3-team1  =  Scotland| RD3-score1 = 2| RD3-team2  =  Europe
| RD3-score2 = 2
}}

England won the final because they were 2 holes up in the four matches. Scotland won the third-place match because they were 9 holes up in the four matches.

1977
The tournament was played on 18, 19 and 20 August between eight teams, the four home nations, Continental Europe, the United States, Australasia and the Rest of the World. The event was played at Gleneagles. Teams were divided into two group of four with the each team playing the others in the group on the first two days. The leading two teams in each group then played semi-finals and a final on the last day. There were teams of 5 with each match consisting of 4 singles matches over 18 holes. In the group matches, one point was awarded for each match won with half a point for a halved match. The order of the groups was decided on points won.

The teams were:
England: Tony Jacklin (Captain), Neil Coles, Nick Faldo, Tommy Horton, Peter Dawson
Scotland: Brian Barnes (Captain), Ken Brown, Bernard Gallacher, David Ingram, Sam Torrance
Wales: Brian Huggett (Captain), Simon Cox, Craig Defoy, David Llewellyn, David Vaughan
Ireland: Christy O'Connor Snr (Captain), Eamonn Darcy, Christy O'Connor Jnr, John O'Leary, Eddie Polland
Continental Europe: Ángel Gallardo (Captain), Francisco Abreu, Seve Ballesteros, Baldovino Dassù, Philippe Toussaint
United States: Billy Casper (Captain), Danny Edwards, Bob Murphy, Jerry Pate, Lee Trevino
Australasia: Bruce Devlin (Captain), Bob Charles, Greg Norman, Simon Owen, Ian Stanley
Rest of the World: Hugh Baiocchi (Captain), Ernesto Acosta, Simon Hobday, Hsieh Min-Nan, Kazuo Yoshikawa

Group matchesThursday 18 AugustFriday 19 AugustGroup tables

Knock-outSaturday 20 August'''

The Rest of the World won the third-place match because they were 8 holes up in the four matches.

References

Team golf tournaments
Golf tournaments in the United Kingdom